Molières-Glandaz (Vivaro-Alpine: Molèiras de Glandàs) is a former commune in the Drôme department in southeastern France. On 1 January 2016, it was merged into the new commune Solaure-en-Diois.

Population

See also
Communes of the Drôme department

References

Former communes of Drôme
Populated places disestablished in 2016